Colonie is a village in Albany County, New York, United States. The population was 7,793 at the 2010 census.

The village of Colonie is within the town of Colonie. Both are north of the city of Albany, the capital of New York.

History 
The village of Colonie was incorporated on March 2, 1921, and was barely developed beyond anything more than buildings along the Albany-Schenectady Road (NY Route 5).

The village fire department was established in 1931.

Geography
According to the United States Census Bureau, the village has a total area of 3.3 square miles (8.6 km)of which 3.3 square miles (8.5 km)  is land and 0.30% is water.

Location

Demographics

At the 2000 census, there were 7,916 people, 3,174 households, and 2,253 families living in the village. The population density was 2,396.7 inhabitants per square mile (926.2/km). There were 3,264 housing units at an average density of 988.2 per square mile (381.9/km). The racial makeup of the village was 91.68% White, 3.54% Black or African American, 0.09% Native American, 3.08% Asian, 0.03% Pacific Islander, 0.43% from other races, and 1.16% from two or more races. Hispanic or Latino of any race were 1.59% of the population.

Of the 3,174 households 27.8% had children under the age of 18 living with them, 56.4% were married couples living together, 10.6% had a female householder with no husband present, and 29.0% were non-families. 23.3% of households were one person and 9.4% were one person aged 65 or older. The average household size was 2.49 and the average family size was 2.95.

The age distribution was 21.6% under the age of 18, 6.7% from 18 to 24, 27.6% from 25 to 44, 26.8% from 45 to 64, and 17.3% 65 or older. The median age was 41 years. For every 100 females, there were 93.5 males. For every 100 females age 18 and over, there were 89.6 males.

The median household income was $54,597 and the median family income  was $63,822. Males had a median income of $38,515 versus $30,929 for females. The per capita income for the village was $23,596. About 2.5% of families and 3.9% of the population were below the poverty line, including 3.3% of those under age 18 and 4.2% of those age 65 or over.

Education
The village is in the South Colonie Central School District.

References

External links

Village of Colonie, NY, webpage

Villages in New York (state)
Colonie, New York
Villages in Albany County, New York
Populated places established in 1921
1921 establishments in New York (state)